Panthères Football Club are a Beninese football club based in Djougou. They currently play in the Benin Premier League for 2014–15 season.

Football clubs in Benin